Bola Afonja (born 21 February 1943) is a Nigerian politician. He was Minister of Labour under Ernest Shonekan, and was once a member of the board of trustees of the All Nigeria Peoples Party (ANPP).

He was Chairman of the Board of Directors of First Bank plc, Nigeria's biggest commercial bank. He retired from the Board following his 70th birthday on 21 February 2013.

References

Living people
1943 births
All Nigeria Peoples Party politicians
Federal ministers of Nigeria